The City Wall of Taizhou, or Southern Great Wall of China is located in Linhai City, Zhejiang Province, China. It is a national AAAA level tourist attraction and was listed as a Major Historical and Cultural Site Protected at the National Level in 2001.

Introduction 
Located 300 km south of Shanghai and 230 km southeast of Hangzhou, Linhai is a famous tourist destination and is of great historical significance while being the former capital of Taizhou. The city wall was originally built in East Jin Dynasty, finished in Tang Dynasty and later rebuilt during the Dazhongxiangfu period of Song Dynasty. The city wall was also called "Southern Great Wall of China" as it served as a barrier protecting the local inhabitants from Wokou. In addition to that, the city wall also prevent floods from submerging the city during rainy seasons. The east wall, which is of 1615 meters, was demolished in 1956. The north wall on the ridge line of about 2300 meters was reconstructed in 1990s.

Gallery

References

City walls in China
Buildings and structures in Taizhou, Zhejiang
Tourist attractions in Taizhou, Zhejiang
Major National Historical and Cultural Sites in Zhejiang